The island mouse or eastern red forest rat (Nesomys rufus) is a species of rodent in the family Nesomyidae.
It is endemic to Madagascar.

References

Nesomys
Mammals of Madagascar
Mammals described in 1870
Taxa named by Wilhelm Peters
Taxonomy articles created by Polbot